Worlds End Highway is a road in the Yorke and Mid North region of South Australia running north from Eudunda through Robertstown to Goyder Highway 18 km southeast of Burra. The northern terminus of the highway is in a locality named Worlds End, leading to the name of the highway.

Route
Worlds End Highway is entirely contained within the Regional Council of Goyder local government area.

References

Highways in South Australia
Mid North (South Australia)